The Tune ship (Tuneskipet) is a Viking ship exhibited in the Viking Ship Museum  (Vikingskipshuset på Bygdøy) in Bygdøy, Oslo.

The Tune ship is of the karve,  a small type of longship with broad hull. It was found at the Haugen farm on the island of Rolvsøy in the parish of Tune in Viken, Norway.  It was discovered in a ship burial mound (Båthaugen, from the Old Norse words båt meaning boat and haugr meaning mound or barrow). It was discovered when the burial mound was opened and the site was excavated by archaeologist Oluf Rygh in 1867. It was named the Tune ship by Professor Rygh after excavation. This is due to the discovery being located in Tune parish.

The ship was built around AD 900. It was made principally of clinkered oak planks. It is of rugged construction with naturally grown ribs, thick crossbeams and a solid gunwale.

Other sources
Marstrander, Sverre (1999) Tuneskipet (Sarpsborg: Borgarsyssel Museum)

References

External links

1867 archaeological discoveries
Viking ships
Archaeological sites in Norway
Ships preserved in museums
Viking ship burials
10th century in Norway